Sun Zhongliang (26 August 1936 – 29 June 2019) was a Chinese electrical engineer and professor at Southeast University who specialized in extremely high frequency research. He was an academician of the Chinese Academy of Engineering and a recipient of the State Science and Technology Progress Award (First Class).

Biography 
Sun was born on 26 August 1936 in Shanghai, Republic of China. He tested into the Department of Radio Engineering of Nanjing Institute of Technology (now Southeast University) in 1955, and was hired by the university as a faculty member upon graduation in 1960. He became an associate professor in 1983 and full professor in 1987.

Sun was a renowned expert in the field of extremely high frequency (EHF). He solved a series of difficult problems in EHF, with important applications in military engineering and 5G mobile communication. For his contributions, he was awarded the State Science and Technology Progress Award (First Class) as well as six provincial and ministerial science prizes. Sun was elected an academician of the Chinese Academy of Engineering in 2001. He was a member of the 8th, 9th, and 10th Chinese People's Political Consultative Conference (CPPCC).

Sun died from an illness on 29 June 2019 in Nanjing, at the age of 82.

References 

1936 births
2019 deaths
Chinese electrical engineers
Southeast University alumni
Academic staff of Southeast University
Members of the Chinese Academy of Engineering
Engineers from Shanghai
Educators from Shanghai